Walkersville Covered Bridge is a historic covered bridge near Walkersville, Lewis County, West Virginia. It was built in 1903, and is a Queen post truss bridge measuring 12 feet, 1 1/2 inches wide and 39 feet, 4 inches long. It has red board-and-batten siding and a standing seam metal roof.  It was built to span the right fork of the West Fork River.

It was listed on the National Register of Historic Places in 1981.

References

See also
List of covered bridges in West Virginia

Bridges completed in 1903
Covered bridges on the National Register of Historic Places in West Virginia
Buildings and structures in Lewis County, West Virginia
National Register of Historic Places in Lewis County, West Virginia
Transportation in Lewis County, West Virginia
Queen post truss bridges in the United States
Road bridges on the National Register of Historic Places in West Virginia
Wooden bridges in West Virginia
1903 establishments in West Virginia